Back into the Woods is the sixth studio album by British singer-songwriter Ed Harcourt, released in 2013 in the UK.  The album was written over the course of a month after Harcourt completed recording Lustre. The album was recorded in Abbey Road Studios during a single six-hour-long session on April 26, 2007.

The album's nine tracks feature Harcourt performing on piano with little or no accompanying instrumentation.  The album was positively reviewed by music critics.

Track listing
"The Cusp & the Wane"
"Hey Little Bruiser"
"Wandering Eye"
"Murmur in My Heart"
"Back into the Woods"
"Brothers & Sisters"
"The Pretty Girls"
"Last Will & Testament"
"The Man That Time Forgot"

References

2012 albums
Ed Harcourt albums